The First Gentleman is a 1945 historical play by the British writer Norman Ginsbury. It portrays the relationship between the future George IV, his daughter Princess Charlotte of Wales and her husband Leopold. It is set during the Regency era and features many other prominent figures of the time.

Its West End run lasted for 553 performances between 18 July 1945 and 16 November 1946, originally at the New Theatre before transferring to the Savoy. The cast included Robert Morley as Prince George, Wendy Hiller as Charlotte and Philip Friend as Leopold.

Film adaptation
In 1948 the work was adapted into a film of the same title directed by Alberto Cavalcanti and starring Jean-Pierre Aumont, Joan Hopkins and Cecil Parker.

References

Bibliography
 Wearing, J.P. The London Stage 1940-1949: A Calendar of Productions, Performers, and Personnel.  Rowman & Littlefield, 2014.

1945 plays
Plays set in London
British plays adapted into films
West End plays
Plays set in the 19th century